Anhangá or Anhanga (tupi: Ahiag̃; maué: Anhang, "spirit"), is a figure present in the cosmovision of several native groups from Brazil  and indianist literature.

In the tupinambá culture 
The tupinambá people believed that Anhangá could take many different forms. Despite being a bigger threat to the dead, he would be seen often by the living, who could also have their bodies and souls punished. The mere memory of the suffering inflicted by Anhangá was enough to torment them. The tupinambás were said to fear this malignant spirit more than anything else. This spirit would be one of the biggest concerns when it came the time to prepare the dead for their journey to Guajupiá, the "Land Without Evils". Food offerings would be made alongside a fire to warm the body. Food was offered to sustain the dead as well as to ensure Anhangá would eat the food instead of the dead. The fire, meanwhile, had the goal of not only providing warmth, but also protection to the dead, as it would keep Anhangá away. The living would also encourage the dead who had already reached Guajupiá as to not let their fires go out.

In the Mawé culture 

To the Mawés, Anhangás are portrayed as demons, followers of Yurupari (Jurupari). These creatures are known and feared for being able to take various forms to fool people, curse, possess, kidnap, kill and eat them. Anhangá either can't swim or is afraid of entering the water out of fear for Sukuyu'wera, the water protecting spirit, his enemy.

Protector of animals 

Anhanga is described as a "genie of the forest and protector of the fauna and flore in tupi mithology", who "[...] doesn't devour nor kill. He avenges animals victimized by insatiable hunters".

It is said Anhangá takes the form of a white deer with fiery eyes and that he is the protector of the hunt in the forests, protecting animals against hunters, especially females with babies. When the prey was able to escape, the indigenous said Anhangá had protected it and helped it escape.

Tonicity 
Regarding the variable pronunciation:

Colonialism, Sincretism and Indianism

In Jesuit missionaryism 
The missionary José de Anchieta, in his auto Tupi-Medieval, gives the name Anhangupiara, word created from the agglutination of the nouns anhangá and jupiara, to an angel, whose meaning in the Latin translation of the anchietan tupi would be the enemy of the anhangás.

Another jesuit, António Vieira, described "Añangá" in the Sermon on Incontinences, as a duplicitous entity worshiped by the indigenous folk.

Bantu false cognate 
Another hybridization took place with banto:

In modern literature and contemporary missionaryism 
Anhangá is present in the indianist works of Brazilian novelist Gonçalves Dias (1823–1864). In "O Canto do Piaga" and "Deprecação" Anhangá is characterized as a cruel and merciless entity, allied with the colonizers. In "Caramuru", the author presents Anhangá or Anhangás taking the roles of demons, as well as presenting Tupã taking a creator role in the creation of a colonialist myth paralleled to the creaton myth of the catholic doctrine.

Neo-Pentecostal churches with a strong presence in the mawé communities reinterpret Anhangá as an announcement of evil and a demonic manifestation, to be fought by prayers and chants.

See also 

 Guarani mythology
 Tupi people
 Animism
 Caipora
 Curupira

References

Bibliography 

 
 
 

Deities
Guaraní mythology